Matilda Bogdanoff (born 8 October 1990) is a Finnish hurdler. She competed in the 60 metres hurdles event at the 2014 IAAF World Indoor Championships.

References

External links

1990 births
Living people
Finnish female hurdlers
Place of birth missing (living people)